Acetoxyacetylaminofluorene is a derivative of 2-acetylaminofluorene used as a biochemical tool in the study of carcinogenesis.  It forms adducts with DNA by reacting with guanine at its C-8 position.;  This results in breaks in one strand of the DNA.

See also
 Hydroxyacetylaminofluorene

References

Carcinogens